The British Channel 4 science fiction comedy-drama Misfits features a number of fictional characters. The main cast comprises five characters, while a number of additional characters support the show. The main cast originally consisted of Alisha Daniels (Antonia Thomas), Curtis Donovan (Nathan Stewart-Jarrett), Kelly Bailey (Lauren Socha), Nathan Young (Robert Sheehan), and Simon Bellamy (Iwan Rheon). After Sheenan (Nathan) left the role Rudy Wade (Joseph Gilgun) was introduced. Rheon (Simon) and Thomas (Alisha) departed their roles at the end of series 3. Seth (Matthew McNulty) is initially introduced as a guest character but later begins appearing in a recurring role. Jess (Karla Crome) and Finn (Nathan McMullen) join the cast in a main role at the beginning of series four. Supporting characters introduced have included Sally (Alex Reid), Pete (Michael Obiora), Superhoodie, Nikki (Ruth Negga), Shaun (Craig Parkinson) and Greg (Shaun Dooley).

Main cast

The initial five main characters are brought together when they are all sent to community service for various crimes. A storm occurs and the group are struck by it without any damage. They discover they each have a superpower, with the exception of Nathan, who does not find out his power until the finale of the first series. Their probation worker Tony is also affected by the storm and flies into a murderous rage. They kill Tony in self-defence. After this, the group go on to become more of a unit when further developments of how many other people who were affected by the storm comes to light. Rudy, Jess and Finn eventually join the group when they end up in community service, integrating with the group as the original members leave.

Nathan Young
 Alongside the rest of the 'ASBO five', Nathan gains his powers in the storm. Nathan's powers aren't revealed till later in the series, whereupon in S1E6 Nathan falls off the roof of the community center and is impaled on the fence below him. Nathan wakes up later in his coffin, realizing he is immortal. Nathan dies a total of five times in the series. In S2E2 Nathan is revealed to have a 'second' power, as he is able to see the ghosts of the recently deceased. Nathan later goes on to sell his power and buy a new one in S2E7, exchanging his immortality for the ability to use 'real' magic. His new power is only visible in the short 'Vegas Baby!'.

Simon Bellamy
 Simon began the series with the power of invisibility, tying into Simon's reclusiveness and how he feels 'invisible' when alienated by the rest of the group. While Initially he struggles with controlling his power, he gains access to it fairly quickly. in S2E7, Simon sells his power, and purchases another. Simon gains the ability of Foresight to begin with, making him able see the imminent future of a course of events. He can alter his future by choosing a different course of events if he chooses to. When Simon realizes he has to become 'Superhoodie', he purchases two other powers. Immunity, and One-way time travel. Immunity is the ability to be unaffected by other people's powers, whilst One way time travel is the power to travel back in time to any desired point, however, unlike Time Reversal, the user cannot return to the present and instead of appearing in their past-self, they appear as a duplicate whilst their past-self stays where they were at that time.

Kelly Bailey
 Kelly originally had the power of telepathy.
After she sold this power she then gained a power that made her a rocket scientist.
She briefly gained the power to turn back time in an alternate time stream (created when the previous owner of the turn back time power tried to kill Hitler and inadvertently gave Hitler his cell phone - enabling the Nazis to win WW2) but switched back to being a rocket scientist after correcting the time stream.

Curtis Donovan
 Curtis originally had the power of time manipulation, allowing him to travel back and change events, stemming from his regret over the incident that led to his community service. He later exchanged this for the power to swap biological sex, and later the ability to resurrect the dead (albeit as zombies).

Alisha Daniels
 Alisha initially gained the ability to make those who touch her skin go into a sexual frenzy towards her. She later gains the power to see through another person's eyes. She knew Rudy in high school, and has a relationship with Curtis. She later fell in love with future Simon, carrying those feelings over to the present Simon when his future self died. Her death prompted Simon's return to the past.

Rudy Wade
 Portrayed by Joe Gilgun, Rudy is given community service after damaging his ex-girlfriend's car. The storm affected him so that he splits off a gentler and sadder version of himself, Rudy Two. It's later revealed that there was a third, more aggressive Rudy as well, who the other two let get arrested and go to prison. A shallow womaniser for most of the show, he changes his ways after meeting and falling in love with the nun Nadine. He ends up in a relationship with Jess.

Jess

Jess is played by Karla Crome. She and Finn join community service at the same time. She gained the ability to see through solid objects. She has a brief relationship with Alex, but eventually ends up with Rudy.

Finn Samson

Finn is played by Nathan McMullen. His power is telekinesis, though he can usually only move small objects with great effort. For most of his time on community service he has a deep crush on Jess.

Abbey Smith
Portrayed by Natasha O'Keeffe, Abbey Smith believes she lost her memory in the storm, since she can't remember her life before it. Rudy and Finn encounter her drunk and unconscious at a party; she later pretends to be on community service to keep Finn out of trouble, but is found out and sentenced to community service for real.

Alex
Alex is played by Matt Stokoe. A barman who works with Curtis, he first appears in the fourth series and behaves oddly around women, including Jess when she asks him out. It's revealed he has no powers as he wasn't caught in the storm, but has been affected by someone else's power. And the end of series four he is injured and receives a lung transplant from a storm survivor, gaining the power to remove the powers of others by having sex with them. At the start of series five, he breaks into the community centre to save Jess from a possessed Finn, and is sentenced to community service as punishment.

Supporting cast

Sally
Sally, played by Alex Reid, appears in the first episode. Sally is revealed to be the fiancée of Tony, whom the group have killed in self-defence. She becomes the group's new probation worker. She suspects that the Misfits are involved in Tony's disappearance and she begins leaving threatening messages in group's lockers. She begins contacting Simon over the internet under the alias 'Shygirl18'. In the 4th episode of series 1
, she searches their lockers, finding Tony's credit card in Simon's. In the next episode, she fakes an interest in Simon in order to find evidence that the Misfits are involved in Tony's death, but Simon rejects her suggestion that he should turn the other Misfits in, proclaiming they are the only friends he has. Simon accidentally kills her when he throws her against a door as they violently fight each other. Simon keeps her corpse in a freezer in the community centre and visits her body often. In the first episode of the second series, Simon realises that he needs to dispose of Sally's body, since a search is to be conducted. While sneaking her out, under a sheet in a wheelbarrow, he is confronted by the other Misfits, and tells them what happened. At the end of the episode, the Misfits wrap her in blankets, row out to the middle of the canal, and dump her weighted body into the water. Sally re-appears in the finale of Series 3, when she is brought back by a medium. Thinking she has been brought back to take revenge upon the gang she tricks Simon into kissing her, filming it on his phone and sends it to Alisha. She later tries to push Alisha off a building but is stopped when Tony finds her. He tells her they have both been brought back to say goodbye to one another, they then embrace and kiss, moving on to the afterlife.

Pete
Pete, played by Michael Obiora, first appears in episode 3 of series 1. He first appears when investigating the disappearance of Gary and Tony. He later tells Sally that Tony has purchased a ticket for a flight using his credit card so it is likely Tony is alive. In episode 4, it is revealed that he was the policeman who arrested Curtis for drugs possession, resulting in his community service sentence. When Curtis goes back in time, we see Pete in the club. He asks Alisha where she bought drugs from and rejects her advances. After Alisha points out a drug dealer who is speaking to Curtis and Sam he searches them. Upon finding Curtis with a small amount of drugs he gives Curtis community service to send out a message because of his status. In episode 6 of series 1 he comes looking for Sally at the community centre. He later appears in episode 1 of series 2 when questioning the group about Sally's whereabouts after her disappearance and tells Shaun that he may disappear next.

Superhoodie
Superhoodie, played by Daniel Ilabaca, first appears in one of Simon's videos, helping a member of the public, and features on posters both on the E4 website game and in the show. In the first series' finale, Superhoodie helps Nathan escape a group of 'Virtue' followers. His face is concealed by a hood and a black mask. He is later seen in another of Simon's videos, demonstrating extreme free running skills before talking to Simon. He reveals he has been watching the Misfits and is aware of their abilities. In the first series, Superhoodie is portrayed by free runner Neil Hutson. Superhoodie returns in the first episode of the second series, dressed in black, initially studying a room full of photos of the Misfits along with five large digital clocks counting down to an unspecified target. He throws a paper aeroplane from a building across a river to Kelly, informing her to go to Nathan's grave where she discovers his immortality. He returns at the conclusion of the episode, saving Curtis from suffocation at the hands of Lucy. In the second episode of the second series, he shields a temporarily mortal Nathan from his brother Jamie's exploding car, causing him to be apparently hurt quite badly by shrapnel, though he manages to escape. In episode 3 of Series 2 Superhoodie leads the group to Nikki's flat. Having repeatedly saved Alisha from danger, Superhoodie reveals himself to be a future version of Simon to her, and makes her keep his identity hidden. It is revealed that he is immune to Alisha's power, while present-day Simon is not. They enter into a secret relationship and he tells her that he travelled through time to make sure particular events happen. In the fourth episode of the second series, Ollie is put into community service along with the group but is soon after killed by Tim, and his heart is transplanted to Nikki, who in turn gains Ollie's power. Alisha confronts future Simon when she discovers that he knew it would happen but didn't stop it, but Simon tells her that if he saved Ollie, there would have been consequences. When Tim kidnaps Kelly, the group steal £100,000, but when they deliver it to him, Tim takes the other Misfits hostage. Alisha escapes her binds but Tim catches her. He is about to shoot her but future Simon, who has been timing the events, drops down from a skylight and takes the bullet. As Tim leaves to complete his next 'level', Alisha cradles a dying Simon and admits she is in love with him. He dies and at his instruction Alisha burns his body, having received the key to his base. Alisha reveals Superhoodie's true identity to Simon after the Misfits go public, as well as her relationship with him, but this timeline is erased by Curtis. In the three-month gap between the second series' finale and the Christmas special, Alisha tells Simon who Superhoodie really is.

The Independent described the character as a "guardian angel for the misfits" who is "seen free-running, leaping from rooftop to rooftop until he stands, Batman-like, surveying the city".

Shaun
Shaun, played by Craig Parkinson, is a probation worker who replaces Sally's position in the second series. He has a very relaxed, somewhat bored attitude towards the group, and although he seems to understand when they are lying to him, he doesn't let it bother him if it happens beyond his working hours, at which point he washes his hands of all responsibility and goes home. He is also not worried by the fact that the last two probation workers have disappeared. The Misfits unintentionally kill him on his first day of work when they assume that he is the disguised Lucy, but Curtis is able to undo the event. In the second series' penultimate episode he overhears Nathan, Curtis and Simon talking about their powers and sells them out to the media before leaving the country. Curtis later rewinds this timeline. He becomes the group's probation worker when they begin community service for a second time. In the fifth episode of the third series he is stabbed by a girl called Jen who swaps bodies with Kelly. As he is dying from the wound in the changing rooms of the community centre, the group revealed to him that they have superpowers. He laughs in his last few moments expressing his disbelief that he has remained ignorant to the situation. In an alternative timeline where the Nazis won WWII, Shaun was a Nazi officer. He had a relationship with Alisha after she was caught drunk driving and he released her. He was shot by Kelly, who wanted to release Seth from prison and was disappointed to find out that Alisha was cheating on him with Simon.

Neela Debnath of The Independent labelled Shaun "lecherous". MSN News opined that Shaun was played "brilliantly" and questioned if the fact that he makes it clear that he "couldn't care less about the young offenders" has anything to do with him having "survived longer than any of his predecessors". Neela Debnath of The Independent felt Shaun's ending was "shocking" adding that even though all previous probation workers had been killed it was "completely unexpected" when Shaun was killed. Debnath added that out of all previous probation workers he was "the most memorable because of his apathetic attitude towards youth offenders and the rehabilitation system". She added that Parkinson's performance has been "brilliant" through his time on the show which means both he and his character will "be sorely missed". On his final moments she added that they were "very touching" because there was an understanding between the group and Shaun. Digital Spy branded Shaun "fab".

Nikki
Nikki, played by Ruth Negga, is a young woman with an unspecified heart condition who becomes involved with the gang. She is introduced in the second episode of the second series when Curtis' inverted power causes him to 'flash forward' and experience a future event, a romantic encounter on a rooftop with Nikki. The Misfits then encounter her in the present when they break into her flat, mistakenly believing it was the residence of Superhoodie, who had led the group there. Curtis continues to visit her, learning about her heart condition. When Ollie, the group's new member of community service, is shot and killed, Nikki is given his heart. The transplant cures her heart condition, but also leaves her with Ollie's ability to teleport. Nikki possesses little to no control over this ability. When Nikki feels she is about to teleport, she experiences a sensation similar to falling, or being drawn backwards, and then she immediately shifts to her new location. Nikki and Curtis begin a relationship after he tells her about the Misfits' powers and the effects of the storm. During a fancy dress party, the two of them experience the events from Curtis' 'flash-forward' again. In the Christmas special, Curtis and Nikki sell their abilities to Seth, who can deal powers. The couple plan to travel together, but Nikki is shot and killed by an armed robber under the orders of a priest named Elliot pretending to be Jesus. Her death inspires the group to try to regain their abilities, as Nikki would never have died if they still had their powers. Curtis' power to rewind time is no longer available, since he sold his power to Seth, and Nikki remains dead.

Seth

Greg
Greg, played by Shaun Dooley, is the gang's fifth probation worker, replacing Laura, who was bitten by a zombie and subsequently killed by Rudy before she could start her first day. He first appears at the end of the first episode of Series 4. He mocks Finn in front of the group. Later on Finn asks Greg if he can leave the community centre, to which Greg responds by asking him to pay him. When Finn pays him Greg takes his money and refuses to let him leave.

Dooley had been a fan of the show since it began so approached the casting director for a role. The casting director later told the producer of the show who agreed that Dooley would be "ideal" as the new probation worker. Dooley described Greg, saying he is "really, really horrible – a complete sociopath. He can flip on the turn of a coin from being really nice to completely horrific, and he’s suddenly someone who’s going to kill you there and then. He’s brilliant to play". He added that the character is "a test to play" due to his nature to "flip" when he is acting naturally, similar to "Jekyll and Hyde within his own personality". Dooley felt the part a challenge to play due to Greg's intensity. Dooley said Greg is "very funny, but because his character’s so funny", explaining that the audience are supposed to "laugh at him" rather than with him.

Digital Spy's Morgan Jeffrey said the first episode of series 4 begins to feel like the show has "begun to find itself again", which is "compounded with the magnificent arrival of sinister new probation worker Greg". Neela Debnath of The Independent commented that Greg "is terrifying and may even have a scary power of his own. However, he comes across as far too aggressive and hostile without any reason it would seem. His frightening temperament will probably be explained later on but at the moment it feels too jarring and he is just a pure ball of fury". Radio Times said "Dooley growls, gnashes his teeth and generally has a whale of a time as the terrifying new probation officer".

Lola
Lola, played by Lucy Gaskell is introduced in episode 2 of series 4. Lola was originally an aspiring actress called Debby. As a result of the storm, her desire to better embody her characters transformed her into one of her roles: Lola, a manipulative seductress with a troubled past. As Lola, she seduced men into killing her ex-boyfriends, eventually setting her sights on Curtis while pretending to be a trainee probation worker. After manipulating him into killing her ex-boyfriend Jake, Curtis eventually learns the truth behind her power while Lola begins to set up Curtis's murder. Events transpire in which Lola shoots and kills her new boyfriend in an attempt to stage a double murder. This results in Curtis getting shot, but his current situation as a zombie leaves him invulnerable allowing him to bite and then murder Lola. This is then followed by his own suicide.

Digital Spy's Catriona Wightman said Lola is "so clearly bad news that she should really wear a hat with a flashing warning sign. She's properly full on, purring about how she loves bad boys and spraying graffiti to watch Curtis "scrub". Unsurprisingly, this ends up with the duo doing the dirty at the end of the episode". Wightman felt it "hard to really care" about the storyline as she knew it was only building up the storyline for the next episode.

Other characters

References

Misfits
Misfits
 
Lists of British television series characters